Bogniebrae is a small rural settlement in Aberdeenshire, Scotland. It is located at the junction of the A97 and B9001 roads,  from Huntly. It contains the Bognie Arms public house and hotel and a few houses.

References

Villages in Aberdeenshire